"Good Day" is a song recorded in two languages (Korean and Japanese) by South Korean singer IU. The Korean version was released on December 9, 2010, as the lead single for IU's third extended play (EP) Real. It was written by Kim Eana, while production was handled by Lee Min-soo. The Japanese version was originally included on IU's first Japanese extended play I□U, released on December 14, 2011, before being released on March 21, 2012, as IU's first single album Good Day.

"Good Day" received generally positive reviews by music critics. Billboard magazine crowned it as the best K-pop song released in the 2010s. Commercially, the song debuted atop the Gaon Digital Chart, topping the chart for five weeks and becoming the sixth best-selling single in South Korea, selling more than 4.4 million digital units. The Japanese version reached the top five on the Oricon Singles Chart, and sold more than 30,000 physical copies in the country.

Background and release
"Good Day" was released on December 9, 2010, simultaneously with the singer's third extended play (EP) Real. On November 15, 2011, Loen announced, that IU was signed to EMI Music Japan and was set to release an extended play with her greatest hits recorded in Japanese, on December 14, 2011, titled I□U.

Music and lyrics
The Korean version of "Good Day" was written by Kim Eana, while production was handled by Lee Min-soo. In terms of musical notation, the song is composed in the key of A♭ Major, with a tempo of 128 beats per minute, and runs for 3:53.

Reception
Writing for New Straits Times, Bibi Nurshuhada Ramli described "Good Day" as IU's breakout song. South China Morning Posts Sylvia Issa described the songs as a "unique musical phenomenon". In November 2019, Billboard magazine compiled a list of the 100 Greatest K-Pop Songs of the 2010s, with the single "Good Day" ranking at number one.

Commercially, "Good Day" debuted at number one of the South Korean singles chart on the 51st issued week of 2010. It topped the chart for five consecutive weeks, falling to no. four on the fourth issued week in 2011. The song held the record for the most weeks at number one until 2018, when it was beaten by iKon "Love Scenario". Furthermore, the single topped the monthly singles chart in December 2010. It was selected as Gallup Korea's Song of the Year in 2011.

Track listing

Accolades

Chart performance

Weekly charts

Year-end charts

Sales

Release history

References

2010 singles
2010 songs
Gaon Digital Chart number-one singles
IU (singer) songs
Korean-language songs
Japanese-language songs
Kakao M singles
Songs with lyrics by Kim Eana